Joseph Eugene Carberry (July 20, 1887 – November 12, 1961) was a pioneer aviator. He won the Mackay Trophy in 1913 with Fred Seydel.

Biography
He was born on July 20, 1887, to John M. Carberry in Waukesha, Wisconsin. He graduated from West Point in 1910, and became one of the first US military aviators in September 1913.

Three days later he won the MacKay Trophy at Encinitas, California, this time flying S.C. No. 23, a Curtiss Model E airplane manufactured by Army aviators entirely from spare parts.

Carberry later served in the Mexican Punitive Expedition and on the Western Front, rising to the rank of major. He was retired for disability in 1924, and promoted to lieutenant colonel on the retired list in 1930.

He died at his home in Arcadia, California on November 12, 1961. He was buried at Fort Rosecrans National Cemetery.

References

External links
Service profile

1887 births
1961 deaths
People from Waukesha, Wisconsin
Military personnel from Wisconsin
Aviators from Wisconsin
Members of the Early Birds of Aviation
Flight altitude record holders
United States Military Academy alumni
United States Army colonels
United States Army Air Service pilots of World War I
United States Army personnel of World War I
Burials at Fort Rosecrans National Cemetery
American aviation record holders